The Friends of the Mount Holyoke Range is a land conservation non-profit organization dedicated to conserving the land, ecosystem, and history of the Mount Holyoke Range in the Connecticut River Valley of Massachusetts. It has been successful in assisting with the conservation of several key parcels of land as well as the renovation of the Summit House on Mount Holyoke. The Friends works in close collaboration with the Kestrel Land Trust and the Massachusetts Department of Conservation and Recreation.  The Friends also sponsors summer concerts and the Seven Sisters Road Race.

References
 Ryan, Christopher J. "Holyoke Range State Park: Eastern Section." 4th ed. Map. Hamilton I. Newell Printing, Amherst 1996.

External links
 Friends of the Mount Holyoke Range Website

Environmental organizations based in Massachusetts
Nature conservation organizations based in the United States